Haversham is a village in the City of Milton Keynes unitary authority area, in Buckinghamshire, England. With Little Linford, it forms the civil parish of Haversham-cum-Little Linford.

The village name is an Old English word that means 'Haefer's homestead'. In the Domesday Book of 1086, when it belonged to the Peverell family, it was listed as Havresham. The ancient manor house in the village, which was fortified in 1304, was largely burnt down, but parts of it still remain in a farm house just outside the main village.

Haversham was once a village of farm-workers' dwellings. , only Hill Farm, Grange Farm and Crossroads Farm remain as active working farms. The village has two distinct settlements separated by farmland. The older part of the village contains the manor house. It lies at elevations between 60 metres and 65 metres above mean sea level, just above the flood plain of the Ouse. In the 1930s, 'New Haversham' was built nearer Wolverton, to house staff working at the Wolverton railway works nearby. New Haversham contains the primary school and is on ground at elevations between 65 metres and 75 metres, overlooking the Ouse Valley.

In the 1970s, ARC dug the river meadows near the site of the old village of Stanton Low for gravel extraction, leaving behind the large man made lakes that surround Haversham to the south today. These lakes are the home to the Hanson Centre and to the Haversham Sailing Club, one of the sailing clubs around Milton Keynes.

Just south of Haversham beside the road to Wolverton, is the Wolverton Railway Viaduct over the valley of the river Great Ouse, of a Stephenson's design, carrying the West Coast Main Line.

The village gave its name to HMS Haversham, a Ham class minesweeper.

Civil parish
Haversham is in the civil parish of Haversham-cum-Little Linford, which also includes Little Linford. This merged parish was formed in 1934 following a County Review order. It formed part of the Newport Pagnell Rural District until 1974 when, as with the rest of NPRD, it became part of the (Buckinghamshire) District of Milton Keynes subsequently renamed the City of Milton Keynes unitary authority.

Listed buildings and structures
The parish has one scheduled ancient monument, one grade I listed building, two grade II* and nine grade II, including Wolverton Viaduct, an 1830s railway bridge.

References

External links

 Community Website

Villages in Buckinghamshire
Areas of Milton Keynes